Pumaren is a surname. Notable people with the surname include:

 Derrick Pumaren, Filipino basketball coach
 Franz Pumaren (born 1963), Filipino basketball player and coach